The 1982 Torneo Godó or Trofeo Conde de Godó was a men's tennis tournament that took place on outdoor clay courts at the Real Club de Tenis Barcelona in Barcelona, Catalonia in Spain. It was the 30th edition of the tournament and was part of the Super Series of the 1982 Grand Prix circuit. It was held from 4 October until 10 October 1982. Fifth-seeded Mats Wilander won the singles title.

Finals

Singles

 Mats Wilander defeated  Guillermo Vilas 6–3, 6–4, 6–3
 It was Wilander's 4th singles title of the year and of his career.

Doubles

 Anders Jarryd /  Hans Simonsson defeated  Carlos Kirmayr /  Cássio Motta 6–3, 6–2

References

External links
 Official tournament website
 ITF tournament edition details
 ATP tournament profile

Barcelona Open (tennis)
Torneo Godo
Torneo Godo
Torneo Godo